Kathy Tough (born February 22, 1969 in Calgary, Alberta) is a retired volleyball player from Canada, who competed for her native country at the 1996 Summer Olympics in Atlanta, Georgia. There she ended up in tenth place with the Women's National Team.

References
Canadian Olympic Committee

1969 births
Living people
Canadian women's volleyball players
Olympic volleyball players of Canada
Sportspeople from Calgary
Volleyball players at the 1996 Summer Olympics